Intel Sandy Bridge-based Xeon microprocessors (often referred to as Sandy Bridge-E) are microprocessors based on the Intel's 32 nm Sandy Bridge architecture for servers, workstations, and high-end desktops. It succeeds the six-core Gulftown/Westmere-EP processor which used the older LGA 1366 package, and uses LGA 2011, LGA 1356 and LGA 1155 socket depending on the package.

Overview 
There are five different families of Xeon processors that were based on Sandy Bridge architecture:

 Sandy Bridge-E (LGA 2011) targeted high-end desktop (HEDT) enthusiast segment. It was branded as Core i7 Extreme Edition and Core i7 processors, despite sharing many similarities with Xeon models.
 Sandy Bridge-EP (LGA 2011) branded as Xeon E5 models aimed at high-end servers and workstations. It supported motherboards equipped with up to 4 sockets.
 Sandy Bridge-EN (LGA 1356) uses a smaller socket for low-end and dual-processor servers on certain Xeon E5 and Pentium branded models.
 Sandy Bridge Xeon (LGA 1155) were mostly identical to its desktop counterparts apart from the missing IGPU despite branded as Xeon E3 processors.
 Gladden (BGA 1284) Xeon E3 models were for embedded applications.

IGPU is absent on most of these processors unless noted otherwise.

Sandy Bridge-E and Sandy Bridge-EP 

All models support: MMX, SSE, SSE2, SSE3, SSSE3, SSE4.1, SSE4.2, AVX, Enhanced Intel SpeedStep Technology (EIST), Intel 64, XD bit (an NX bit implementation), TXT, Intel VT-x, Intel EPT, Intel VT-d, Intel VT-c, Intel x8 SDDC, Hyper-threading (except E5-1603, E5-1607, E5-2603, E5-2609 and E5-4617), Turbo Boost (except E5-1603, E5-1607, E5-2603, E5-2609, E5-4603 and E5-4607), AES-NI, Smart Cache.

Sandy Bridge-EN 

 All models support: MMX, SSE, SSE2, SSE3, SSSE3, SSE4.1, SSE4.2, AVX, Enhanced Intel SpeedStep Technology (EIST), Intel 64, XD bit (an NX bit implementation), TXT, Intel VT-x, Intel EPT, Intel VT-d, Intel VT-c, Intel x8 SDDC, Hyper-threading (except E5-2403 and E5-2407), Turbo Boost (except E5-1428L, E5-2403 and E5-2407), AES-NI, Smart Cache.

Sandy Bridge Xeon 

All models support: MMX, SSE, SSE2, SSE3, SSSE3, SSE4.1, SSE4.2, AVX, Enhanced Intel SpeedStep Technology (EIST), Intel 64, XD bit (an NX bit implementation), TXT, Intel VT-x, Intel EPT, Intel VT-d, Hyper-threading (except E3-1220 and E3-1225), Turbo Boost, AES-NI, Smart Cache.
 All models support uni-processor configurations only.
 Intel HD Graphics P3000 uses drivers that are optimized and certified for professional applications, similar to Nvidia Quadro and AMD FirePro products.
 Die size: D2: 216 mm², Q0: 131 mm²
 Steppings: D2, Q0

Gladden 
BGA 1284 package
All models support: MMX, SSE, SSE2, SSE3, SSSE3, SSE4.1, SSE4.2, AVX, Enhanced Intel SpeedStep Technology (EIST), Intel 64, XD bit (an NX bit implementation), TXT, Intel VT-x, Intel EPT, Intel VT-d, Hyper-threading, AES-NI.
 All models support uni-processor configurations only.
 Die size:216 mm²
 Steppings: D2

See also 
 List of Intel chipsets
 List of Intel CPU microarchitectures

References

Further reading
 

Intel microprocessors